Richard Clauselle Puryear (February 9, 1801 – July 30, 1867) was a U.S. Congressman from North Carolina between the years of 1853 and 1857. A planter and politician, he also served in the North Carolina House for several terms and the state senate.

Early life
Richard Clauselle Puryear was born in Mecklenburg County, Virginia. When he was a child, his family moved to Surry County, North Carolina, where he grew up.

He became a planter near Huntsville. He served as a militia colonel and the magistrate of Surry County before being elected to the North Carolina House of Commons.

Puryear served terms in the North Carolina House in 1838, 1844, 1846, and 1852, as well as a term in the North Carolina Senate before being elected as a Whig to the U.S. House in 1852. He was re-elected in 1854 as a candidate of the American Party and ran unsuccessfully for a third term in 1856.

Puryear was a delegate to the Provisional Confederate Congress in 1861 and to the Peace Congress following the American Civil War. He returned to farming and died at his plantation, "Shallow Ford," in Yadkin County in 1867.

External links

1801 births
1867 deaths
People from Mecklenburg County, Virginia
Members of the North Carolina House of Representatives
North Carolina state senators
People of North Carolina in the American Civil War
People from Yadkin County, North Carolina
Deputies and delegates to the Provisional Congress of the Confederate States
American planters
North Carolina Whigs
Whig Party members of the United States House of Representatives
Know-Nothing members of the United States House of Representatives from North Carolina
19th-century American politicians
People from Surry County, North Carolina